Senator Danner may refer to:

Edward Danner (1900–1970), Nebraska State Senate
Pat Danner (born 1934), Missouri State Senate
Steve Danner (born 1953), Missouri State Senate